Eudesmus posticalis is a species of beetle in the family Cerambycidae. It was described by Félix Édouard Guérin-Méneville in 1844. It is known from Brazil.

References

Onciderini
Beetles described in 1844